The Council of Ministers of Hailemariam Desalegn was the cabinet of the government of Ethiopia during the premiership of Hailemariam Desalegn from 2012 to 2018.

Members

The Hailemariam cabinet included:

References

Cabinets of Ethiopia